Pobre Diabla (Daniela) is a telenovela by TV Azteca in partnership with Venevision Continental, produced by Fides Velasco and starring Alejandra Lazcano, the presentation of Cristobal Lander in Mexico, Hector Arredondo, Leonardo Daniel, Rafael Sanchez Navarro and antagonistic involvement of Claudia Alvarez. It is adapted from telenovela Cara Sucia of Venezuela, which is also a version of the drama La Gata, written by Ines Rodena.

Plot
Daniela (nicknamed La Diabla) and Santiago fall in love with other at first sight after knowing each other accidentally. At first the work of Daniela was to sell newspaper. Daniela is a beautiful girl, a rebel and a fighter, raised in one of the poorest neighborhoods; and Santiago, the son of millionaires, a young man who does not have  any clear aims in his life.

But not everything will be fine, as Santiago's family opposed the relationship, not only by social differences, but by a tragic past that surrounds them. The tragic past is the brutal murder of Daniela's mother, twenty years ago. It was Horatio, Santiago's father who committed the crime, but the blame is on Diego, Daniela's father. The latter is sent to jail for twenty years.

Daniela is a girl who perseveres a lot. She works as a secretary, but the chief of the company wants her and even tries to rape her. In fact, they met when Daniela was in trouble. She was selling newspapers and hit the car with a coin, but it was her future company's manager who helped her. Daniela later gets pregnant with twins by the man she loves, Santiago. This happened after they had sex in a hotel. Paulina later discovers that she is the sister of Sandra, the girl in love with Santiago. In the past, Paulina's father raped her mother, and she gave birth to Paulina. Father Vincent is killed. Michaela has to put Horatio in favor and betrays Diego, who is in fact not the murderer of the mother of Daniela.

Cast

Protagonists
Alejandra Lazcano - Daniela Montenegro "La Diabla"  in love with Santiago, daughter of Diego
Cristóbal Lander - Santiago Fontaner    in love with Daniela, son of Rebeca, stepson of Horacio

Secondary casts
Rafael Sánchez Navarro - Horacio Rodríguez, villain, stepfather of Santiago
Leonardo Daniel - Diego Montenegro father of Daniela
Claudia Álvarez - Santa Madrigal, villain, in love with Santiago, hates Daniela, daughter of Luisa
Gabriela Roel - Carmen Gina Morett - OtiliaGaston Melo - PepinoElvira Monsell - MicaelaArmando Torrea - Antonio "Tony" RodríguezPía Watson - Karina Rodríguez, sister of Santiago and Tony, daughter of Horacio and Rebeca
Carla Carrillo - María Angélica "Pelusa" Soto, best friend of Daniela
Héctor Arredondo - Luciano Enriquez , best friend of Santiago, in love with Daniela
María José Magán - Adriana, in love with Santiago
Alejandra Maldonado - Rebeca, mother of Santiago, Tony and Karina
Javier Díaz Dueñas - Padre Vicente "Chente" RochaMaría Rebeca - Yadira Soto, mother of Maria Angelica
Abel Fernando - FermínJuan Carlos Martín Del Campo - AgustínWendy de los Cobos - Luisa, mother of Santa
Alan Ciangherotti - ChuyAna Gaby - CuquitaJosé Eduardo - CheboMauricio Ajas Ham - ÁngelKaren Sentíes - ChimirraReferences

 CANAL 7 Argentina, in 1972 Alberto Migré created the original major hit Pobre Diabla'' a TV novela produced in Buenos Aires, Argentina.

2009 telenovelas
2009 Mexican television series debuts
2010 Mexican television series endings
Mexican telenovelas
TV Azteca telenovelas
Mexican television series based on Venezuelan television series
Spanish-language telenovelas